Félix Álvarez-Arenas Pacheco (1 October 1913 – 3 October 1992) was a Spanish general who served as Minister of the Army of Spain between 1975 and 1977.

References

1913 births
1992 deaths
Defence ministers of Spain
Government ministers during the Francoist dictatorship